The Worst Day of My Life is an Australian children's television anthology series that first screened on the ABC in 1991–1992.

Cast
 Garry Perazzo as Paul
 Michael Hammett as Guy
 Erica Kennedy as Kerry
 Jim Mckinnon as Tim
 Eamon Kelly as Danny
 Aimee Robertson as Lucy
 Rodney McLennan as Goomy

Episodes
 On The Run
 Out of Your Mind
 Normal
 War and Puss
 Mum's Going To Kill You
 Up The Creek

See also 
 List of Australian television series

References

External links
 
 The Worst Day of My Life at the Australian Television Information Archive
 The Worst Day of My Life at Screen Australia

Australian Broadcasting Corporation original programming
Australian children's television series
1991 Australian television series debuts
1992 Australian television series endings
English-language television shows